The Territory of the Saar Basin was a region occupied and governed by the United Kingdom and France from 1920 to 1935 under a League of Nations mandate. It had its own flag (adopted on July 28, 1920): a blue, white, and black horizontal tricolour. The blue and white stood for Bavaria, and white and black for Prussia, out of whose lands the Saar Territory was formed. Initially, the occupation was under the auspices of the Treaty of Versailles. Its population in 1933 was 812,000, and its capital was Saarbrücken. The territory closely corresponds with the modern German state of Saarland, but was slightly smaller in area. After a plebiscite was held in 1935, it was returned to Germany.

Governing Commission
Under the Treaty of Versailles, the highly industrialized Saar Basin, including the Saar Coal District, was to be occupied and governed by the United Kingdom and France under a League of Nations mandate for a period of fifteen years. Its coalfields were also to be ceded to France. During this time, the Saar Territory was governed by the five-person Governing Commission  (abbreviated Reko) made up of representatives of the occupation forces. Under the terms of the mandate, the Commission had to include at least one French person and one German resident of the Saar. After the fifteen years, a plebiscite would be implemented to determine the Saar's future status.

The Territory comprised the portions of the Prussian Rhenish Trier Region and the Bavarian district of the Palatinate, whose populations included a significant number of the miners who worked in the Saar coal mines. The Territory issued its own postage stamps and currency (the Saar franc).

Chairman of the Governing Commission
The Saar region was governed by the following Chairmen of the Commission of Government:

Regional Council of the Saar Territory
The Saar Territory had no home rule; instead, the Governing Commission (known in German as the Regierungskommission or "Reko" for short) decided on all legislation alone. According to paragraph 23 of the Versailles Treaty the Governing Commission had to establish an assembly of elected representatives of the inhabitants of the Saar Territory in such a manner as the Governing Commission would determine itself. So on 24 March 1922, after four years without any official representation of the people, the Reko decreed the formation of a Saar Territory assembly called the Regional Council. In June 1922 the Governing Commission held the first election of the Regional Council, and starting with the second election of the Regional Council the legislation period was extended from three to four years, with elections in 1928, and in 1932.

The Regional Council counted 30 members, the Governing Commission deliberately determined one person as the chairperson, the president of the Regional Council (Landesratspräsident). In the first legislative period the Reko did not even choose the president from amongst its members. The assembly was no parliament, but only a consultative body; the representatives could be heard, but had no say in the agenda to be debated, let alone in legislation. The agenda of matters to be debated was exclusively set up by the Governing Commission. The members of the Regional Council had neither the right of interpellation, nor the right to actively bring a subject to the agenda, nor the right to table a bill. Its members did not enjoy immunity.  When the Governing Commission did not set an issue on the Regional Council's agenda, they could only send delegations to the League of Nations with pleas, and so they did.

With this situation, all the representatives elected to the Regional Council, regardless of the party, opposed the system of autocratic rule in the Saar Territory.  All parties demanded the return of the Saar Territory to Germany where the people could elect the parliament, and the latter again, the government in self-determination.  Only after the Nazi takeover in Germany, outlawing all other parties except their own NSDAP, did the Bezirk Saar of the SPD and the Saar branch of the KPD leave the opposing block and support the status quo.  For the 1935 status referendum, Social Democrats and Communists suggested, unsuccessfully, that the voters should decide in favour of a continued status quo.

Government-appointed presidents of the Regional Council

Plebiscite

In 1933, a considerable number of political opponents of National Socialism moved to the Saar, as it was the only part of Germany that remained under foreign occupation following World War I. As a result, anti-Nazi groups agitated for the Saarland to remain under British and French occupation under a League of Nations mandate. However, as most of the region's population was German, the mandate was unpopular. A plebiscite was held in the territory on 13 January 1935.

With Adolf Hitler anxious for the propaganda advantages of the return of the Saar to Germany, Joseph Goebbels designed a concerted campaign to sway voters. The support of the local Catholic authorities for a return also helped, as did concerns about Bolshevism, against which Hitler was seen as a bulwark. With a voter participation of 98%, the result of the plebiscite was that the overwhelming majority, 90.8%, voted to re-join the German Reich, with only 8.8% wanting to retain the status quo, primarily as they did not wish to be ruled by Nazis. A third option of joining France received 0.4% of the vote.

Following the vote, Hitler announced that Germany "had no further territorial demands to make of France."

The Nansen International Office for Refugees was responsible for the successful settlement of the Saar refugees in Paraguay after 1935.

German rule

On 17 January 1935, the territory's reunion with Germany was approved by the League Council. On 1 March, Germany re-integrated the region into the German Reich, appointing Josef Bürckel as Reichskommissar für die Rückgliederung des Saarlandes, "Reich Commissioner for the reincorporation of the Saarland."

Many opponents of Nazism who had taken refuge in the territory and former politicians and office holders of the Saar who had collaborated with the occupation were imprisoned.

When re-incorporation was considered complete, the governor's title was changed again to Reichskommissar für das Saarland, "Reich Commissioner for the Saarland," on 17 June 1936. As the new Gau was extended to the Rhine, including the Bavarian district of Palatinate, the region's name was changed again on 8 April 1940 to Saarpfalz, "Saar-Palatinate."

After the Battle of France, the re-annexed territory of the CdZ-Gebiet Lothringen was incorporated in the Reichsgau. The region's name was finalized on 11 March 1941 as Westmark, meaning "Western March" or "Western Boundary," with its governor styled as Reichsstatthalter in der Westmark, "Reich Governor in the Western March." On 28 September 1944, Reich Commissioner Josef Bürckel died, and was succeeded by Willi Stöhr until 21 March 1945, when the region was conquered by troops of the United States Army, which handed over the occupation to French forces in July the same year.

French protectorate

After World War II, a French protectorate was established within borders similar to those of the Territory. A referendum was held on 23 October 1955 which ended French rule and influence. On January 1, 1957, the Saarland joined West Germany.

See also

Saarland
Saar Protectorate, under French control (1947–1956).
Sarre, a department of France (1798–1814).
Saar River
Nazi Germany
German Empire

Notes

External links
Saarland in the page about Germany on WorldStatesmen.org
Part III - Political Clauses for Europe, Treaty of Versailles

1935 disestablishments in Europe
States and territories established in 1920
States and territories disestablished in 1935
Weimar Republic
History of Saarland
Treaty of Versailles
League of Nations mandates
1920 establishments in Europe
Former countries of the interwar period